Shin Bora (born March 17, 1987) is a South Korean comedian, singer, and actress. She made her entertainment debut as a comedian on the variety show Gag Concert in 2010. Shin is also a member of the band Brave Guys, and has released several singles as a solo artist. In 2014, she was cast in a supporting role in the television drama Trot Lovers.

Personal life 
In June 2019, Shin married her non-celebrity boyfriend of the same age. In July 2021, Shin announced her pregnancy and is due to give birth in the fall.

Filmography

Television shows

Drama

Film

Music videos

Discography

Brave Guys

Solo artist

Commercials
 2011 - Grape Day ambassador
 2011 - KFC Garlic Chicken 
 2011 - Philips Air Fryer 
 2011 - S-Oil Ad (With An Il Kwon)
 2012 - Forest Service Ambassador
 2012 - LG U + LTE Mobile Advertising
 2012 - Hyundai Santa Fe 
 2012 - KTB Investment & Radio Advertising
 2012 - Daiso CM, Dong-A Otsuka me is Prio Inc 
 2012 - Richaem 
 2012 - Ambassador of No More School Violence (with other gag Concert members)
 2012 - Samsung Life 
 2012 - LG U + 002 
 2012 - Convenience Courier 
 2012 - World One Day (Phil Leo)
 2013 - Korea Railroad Corporation (With Ailee)
 2013 - Magic Pang (with Kim Giri)

Gag Concert Segments
 Superstar KBS (2010-2011)
 EBS Drama (2010)
 9시쯤 뉴스 (2010-2011)
 Discoveries of Life (2011-2013)
 Brave Guys (2012-2013)
 Geojedo (as Bosuk) (2013)
 Bboom Entertainment (2013-2014)
 Legends of Legends (as Shin Pulip) (2013-2014)

Awards and nominations

Listicles

References

External links 

 
 Shin Bora at YMC Entertainment

1987 births
Living people
South Korean women comedians
South Korean voice actresses
South Korean television actresses
People from Geoje
Kyung Hee University alumni
Gag Concert
21st-century South Korean singers
21st-century South Korean women singers
South Korean expatriates in the United States
Best Variety Performer Female Paeksang Arts Award (television) winners